Hendrick Snyers (born 1611, Antwerp – died 1644, Antwerp), was a Flemish Baroque engraver.

Biography
Snyers was a pupil of Nicolaes Lauwers in 1635–1636. In 1643 he promised to work for the history painter Abraham van Diepenbeeck for three years.

He is known for his engraved portraits of Adam van Noort and Abraham Bloemaert in "Het Gulden Cabinet"

Gallery

References

1611 births
1644 deaths
17th-century engravers
Flemish engravers
Artists from Antwerp